Sexton is an unincorporated community and census-designated place in Irvington Township, Kossuth County, Iowa, United States. It is located at the intersection of U.S. Route 18 and Kossuth CR P60. As of the 2010 census it had a population of 37.

History
Sexton was platted in 1889. Sexton's population was 42 in 1902.

The town contained a post office from August 1888 until May 1974.

A few houses, a Racer's Bar and Grill and the Sexton elevator remain.

Geography
The CDP is on the south side of U.S. Route 18.

Demographics

References

Census-designated places in Kossuth County, Iowa
Census-designated places in Iowa
Populated places established in 1888
1889 establishments in Iowa